The list of rivers of Canada is organized by drainage basin and province.

Canadian drainage basins

The major Canadian drainage basins are the following:
Arctic Ocean
Pacific Ocean
Hudson Bay including James Bay and Ungava Bay
Atlantic Ocean including the Great Lakes-St. Lawrence Drainage basin
Gulf of Mexico by the Mississippi River basin

Rivers by drainage basins 

Pacific Ocean
Arctic Ocean
Hudson Bay
Canada Atlantic

Rivers by Canadian provinces

List of rivers of Alberta
List of rivers of British Columbia
List of rivers of Manitoba
List of rivers of New Brunswick
List of rivers of Newfoundland and Labrador
List of rivers of the Northwest Territories
List of rivers of Nova Scotia
List of rivers of Nunavut
List of rivers of Ontario
List of rivers of Prince Edward Island
List of rivers of Quebec
List of rivers of Saskatchewan
List of rivers of Yukon

See also

Canadian Rivers Day
Geography of Canada
List of longest rivers of Canada
List of rivers of the Americas
List of rivers of the Americas by coastline

Footnotes

External links
Government of Canada - Canadian Geographical Names database
The Canadian Council for Geographic Education - Rivers of Canada - How they shaped our country
Atlas of Canada - Rivers
, GEOnet Names Server